Law v. Siegel, 571 U.S. 415 (2014), is a ruling of the Supreme Court of the United States that describes the extent of the powers of bankruptcy courts in dealing with the bad faith of debtors.

Background
When Law filed for Chapter 7 bankruptcy in 2004, his sole asset was a home in Hacienda Heights, California that was said to be worth $363,000. He declared that:

 there was a first mortgage lien (deed of trust) of $150,000 owing to a bank, and a second for $168,000 owing to "Lin’s Mortgage & Associates"
 there were three judgment liens also registered against the property
 as the value of the two mortgage liens, together with California's homestead exemption of $75,000, was greater than the value of the house, there was nothing available for distribution to Law's general creditors.

It was discovered in subsequent litigation that the second mortgage lien did not exist. The house sold for about $680,000, and only one creditor timely filed a proof of claim which was settled for $120,000. The trustee sought to surcharge the homestead exemption in order to be reimbursed for his legal expenses in the matter.

The courts below
The United States Bankruptcy Court for the Central District of California, in accordance with existing jurisprudence within the Ninth Circuit, ordered that Law's homestead must be surcharged in its entirety. This was affirmed by the Bankruptcy Appeals Panel, and subsequently by the United States Court of Appeals for the Ninth Circuit.

At the Supreme Court
The Ninth Circuit ruling was reversed. In a unanimous ruling, Justice Scalia noted that:

  grants a bankruptcy court authority to "issue any order, process, or judgment that is necessary or appropriate to carry out the provisions of" the Bankruptcy Code,
 the court also has inherent power to sanction abusive litigation practice, but
 a bankruptcy court may not contravene specific statutory provisions.

As  expressly states that a homestead exemption is "not liable for payment of any administrative expense," the court exceeded the limits of its authority under §105(a) and its inherent powers. The Court's ruling in Marrama would not have led to a different result, as its dictum only "suggests that in some circumstances a bankruptcy court may be authorized to dispense with futile procedural niceties in order to reach more expeditiously an end result required by the Code."

The bankruptcy court still has various sanctions available to enforce its judgments:

  outlines circumstances where the court can deny a discharge from bankruptcy
 Federal Rules of Bankruptcy Procedure § authorizes the court to impose sanctions for bad-faith litigation conduct
 it may also possess further sanctioning authority under either  or its inherent powers
  provides that a bankruptcy court's monetary sanction survives the bankruptcy case and is thereafter enforceable through the normal procedures for collecting money judgments
 Fraudulent conduct in a bankruptcy case may also subject a debtor to criminal prosecution under , which carries a maximum penalty of five years' imprisonment

Justice Scalia acknowledged the seeming unfairness of the result:

Impact
The decision is described as "brisk and workmanlike," and "[t]he absence of qualifications or quibbles in its description of the relevant principles make it just the kind of opinion that is likely to be cited frequently in future briefs to the Court." Law is also seen as forcing trustees and creditors to be more aggressive, early in the case, either to object to exemptions or file a motion to extend the time to object to exemptions in order to provide enough time for investigation.

Justice Scalia did not note another sanction that is available under FRBP § which provides that a trustee may still file an objection to a debtor’s claim of exemption "at any time prior to one year after the closing of the case, if the debtor fraudulently asserted the claim of exemption." However, this provision only came into effect in 2008, and therefore was not applicable in this case.

While equitable subordination is authorized under  as a remedy to ensure that creditors acting in bad faith will not be paid until other valid creditors are paid in full, the Bankruptcy Code does not explicitly provide for a similar "equitable disallowance" remedy with respect to debtors acting in bad faith. Although several of the lower courts had previously ruled in favour of such a remedy, it appears that Law strongly supports the conclusion that equitable disallowance does not exist under the Code.

Law, together with Stern v. Marshall, can also be seen as another limitation on the bankruptcy courts' inherent authority under §105, thereby reducing the courts' flexibility and discretion that are necessary for the proper functioning of the bankruptcy system.

Notes

References

External links
 
 

United States Supreme Court cases
United States Supreme Court cases of the Roberts Court
United States bankruptcy case law
United States civil procedure case law
2014 in United States case law
History of Los Angeles County, California